"Little Walter" is the debut single by Tony! Toni! Toné!. It was the lead single from the R&B group's debut album Who.

Background
The narrator in the song describes a roommate by the name of Walter who makes money from an undisclosed job, and rather than pay rent, he spends his money on a lavish lifestyle.  The narrator has had enough of this, and decides to confront Walter about it only for both to break into an argument that lasts "half the night".  When the argument was finished "there was a knock at the door and when Walter went to open it he was blown to the floor" meaning he may have been shot dead (according to the video for the song).  Walter was portrayed by comedian Sinbad in the video whom incidentally was portraying Walter Oakes on "The Cosby Show" spinoff "A Different World". 

The melody is taken from the instrumentation on the spiritual tune "Wade in the Water".

Chart performance
"Little Walter" spent one week at number one on the U.S. Soul chart.  It also peaked at forty-seven on the Billboard Hot 100.

References

External links
[ Song review] on AllMusic

1986 songs
1988 debut singles
Tony! Toni! Toné! songs
Songs written by Denzil Foster
Songs written by Thomas McElroy
Songs written by Raphael Saadiq
Songs written by D'wayne Wiggins
Song recordings produced by Foster & McElroy
Wing Records singles